The following is a complete history of organizational changes in the National Hockey League (NHL). The NHL was founded in 1917 as a successor to the National Hockey Association (NHA), starting out with four teams from the predecessor league, and eventually grew to thirty-two in its current state. The NHL has expanded and contracted numerous times throughout its history, including in 1979 when four teams came over from the World Hockey Association (WHA).

Timeline

Early years

Four/three teams (1917–19) 
The four teams that began the inaugural NHL season were the Montreal Canadiens, the Montreal Wanderers, the original Ottawa Senators, and the Toronto Arenas. However, after completing four games, the Wanderers withdrew from the league due to their arena burning down, and the NHL continued this season and the next with only three teams.

Four teams (1919–24) 
In its third season, 1919–20, the NHL underwent its first expansion, adding the Quebec Bulldogs. Toronto changed its name to Toronto St. Patricks.

1920: Quebec relocates to Hamilton 
For the 1920–21 season, Quebec relocated to Hamilton, becoming the Hamilton Tigers.

Six teams (1924–25) 
Two new teams joined the NHL in its eighth season, the Boston Bruins, and the Montreal Maroons.

Seven teams (1925–26) 
The next season, the NHL added two new teams, the Pittsburgh Pirates and the New York Americans. The Americans were stocked by purchasing the contracts of the Hamilton Tigers players, and the Tigers franchise was subsequently revoked by the league.

Ten teams (1926–31) 
The NHL continued to expand the following 1926–27 season, adding the Chicago Black Hawks, the Detroit Cougars, and the New York Rangers, growing to ten teams, thus more than doubling its size in its first decade of existence. The league realigned into two divisions: the American Division and the Canadian Division. Despite its name, the Canadian Division contained at least one team based in the U.S. throughout its existence.

Midway through the 1926–27 season, the Toronto St. Patricks were sold and renamed the Toronto Maple Leafs. However, the NHL ruled that the team had to still officially use the St. Patricks name until the end of that season.

1930: Pittsburgh relocates to Philadelphia 
For the 1930–31 season, the Pirates moved from Pittsburgh to Philadelphia, becoming the Philadelphia Quakers, and Detroit was renamed the Detroit Falcons.

Eight teams (1931–32) 
After fourteen seasons of steady expansion, the NHL contracted to eight teams, dropping the Philadelphia Quakers and the original Ottawa Senators for the 1931–32 season.

Nine teams (1932–35) 
For the 1932–33 season, after missing one season, the original Ottawa Senators rejoined the NHL, and the Detroit Falcons were renamed the Detroit Red Wings.

1934: Ottawa relocates to St. Louis 
For the 1934–35 season, the Ottawa Senators relocated, becoming the St. Louis Eagles.

Eight teams (1935–38) 
The Eagles folded after one season, and the NHL was once again an eight-team league for three seasons.

Seven teams (1938–42) 
The Montreal Maroons withdrew from the league for the 1938–39 season, further reducing the number of teams in the NHL to seven, shrinking to the size the league was in 1925–26. Play continued for four seasons with seven teams, with one single league table instead of any conference or divisions.

1941: The Americans change their name 
The New York Americans changed their name to the Brooklyn Americans for the 1941–42 season, their last.

Original Six  (1942–67)

The 1942–43 season saw the folding of the Brooklyn Americans and ushered in an unprecedented era of 
franchise stability in the NHL, which lasted without any organizational changes for twenty-five seasons. Eventually, the six teams that competed in the league during this period would come to be known as the Original Six.

Expansion years (1967–91)

Twelve teams (1967–70) 
The 1967 expansion doubled the number of teams in the league, with an upfront expansion fee of $2 million each ($ million today). For the 1967–68 season, six new teams were added to the NHL: the California Seals, the Los Angeles Kings, the Minnesota North Stars, the Philadelphia Flyers, the Pittsburgh Penguins, and the St. Louis Blues.

Within a month into their first season, the California Seals were renamed the Oakland Seals.

Fourteen teams (1970–72) 
The Oakland Seals were renamed the Bay Area Seals for two games before changing their name again to the California Golden Seals for their fourth season in 1970–71. The same season the NHL added two new teams, the Buffalo Sabres and the Vancouver Canucks, paying an expansion fee of $6 million each ($ million today). The Sabres and the Canucks were placed in the East (partially as an effort to provide greater balance between the divisions, and also so they would have rivalries with the other two Canadian teams), while the Chicago Black Hawks moved to the West

Sixteen teams (1972–74) 
Two more teams joined for the 1972–73 NHL season, the New York Islanders and the Atlanta Flames. With the competing World Hockey Association (WHA) starting that same season, the NHL was not able to raise its expansion fee from the price of two years earlier, $6 million ($ million today), with the Islanders paying an additional $5 million ($ million today) to the New York Rangers for infringing on their territory. The Islanders were placed in the East and the Flames were placed in the West.

Eighteen teams (1974–78) 
Two more teams joined for the 1974–75 NHL season, the Washington Capitals and the Kansas City Scouts, but the ongoing competition from the WHA meant that the overall revenue stream of the NHL had not improved, so the league kept the expansion fee for new owners at the $6 million ($ million today) of two years and four years earlier. The earnings situation for the new franchises was so poor that (at least) the Capitals were able to negotiate a reduction to a total fee of $2.85 million ($ million today).

With 18 teams, the league realigned into four divisions and two conferences. The teams were mixed up regardless of North American geography, and thus the new conferences and divisions were not named after geographical references. The East Division became the Prince of Wales Conference and consisted of the Adams Division and Norris Division. The West Division became the Clarence Campbell Conference and consisted of the Patrick Division and Smythe Division.

1976: Two teams relocate
Going into the 1976–77 NHL season, the California Golden Seals relocated and became the Cleveland Barons, and the Kansas City Scouts moved as well, becoming the Colorado Rockies.

Seventeen teams (1978–79) 
For the first time since the 1942–43 season the NHL contracted, merging the Cleveland Barons into the Minnesota North Stars. The North Stars then took the Barons' place in the Adams Division.

Twenty-one teams (1979–91) 
Following seven seasons of revenue draining competition, the NHL–WHA merger was completed for the start of the 1979–80 NHL season. Four teams came over from the WHA, paying an expansion fee of $7.5 million each ($ million today). These new NHL teams were the Edmonton Oilers, the Hartford Whalers, the Quebec Nordiques, and the (original) Winnipeg Jets. This also doubled the number of Canadian teams in the league. Standing at 21 teams for twelve seasons, this was one of the longer stable periods of NHL history, though surpassed by the twenty-five seasons of the Original Six period, when no additions, moves, or name changes occurred.

The Nordiques were placed in the Adams Division, the Whalers in the Norris, and the Oilers and the Jets were both placed in the Smythe. The Washington Capitals moved from the Norris to the Patrick Division. The divisions were meaningless as all teams played a balanced schedule and playoffs were seeded by point standings, not division standings.

1980: Flames relocate to Calgary
For the 1980–81 season, Atlanta relocated and became the Calgary Flames.

1981 realignment
For the 1981–82 season, the teams were realigned to reduce travel. Also, the Norris Division moved to the Campbell Conference and the Patrick Division moved to the Wales Conference.

1982: Colorado relocates to New Jersey
For the 1982–83 season, the Colorado Rockies moved, becoming the New Jersey Devils. The team was moved to the Patrick Division, while the Winnipeg Jets took their place in the Smythe Division

1986: Chicago changes the spelling of its name
The Chicago Black Hawks changed their name to Chicago Blackhawks for the 1986–87 season.

Further expansion 

In 1990, the owners developed a plan to expand the NHL to 28 teams within a decade. The plan was enacted, creating ten years of rapid expansion and relocation in the NHL.

Twenty-two teams (1991–92) 
The  saw the addition of the San Jose Sharks, paying an expansion fee of $45 million ($ million today). The Sharks were placed in the Smythe Division with the other West Coast teams.

Twenty-four teams (1992–93) 
Two new teams joined the league the following season, the Ottawa Senators and the Tampa Bay Lightning, paying an expansion fee of $45 million each ($ million today). The Senators were placed in the Adams Division, and the Lightning in the Norris, so all four divisions would have six teams each.

Twenty-six teams (1993–98) 
The next season, another two teams were added, the Florida Panthers and the Mighty Ducks of Anaheim, paying an expansion fee of $50 million each ($ million today), with Anaheim paying an additional $25 million ($ million today) to the Los Angeles Kings for infringing on their region. The Minnesota North Stars relocated, becoming the Dallas Stars.

The league realigned the teams. The names of the conferences were changed from Campbell and Wales to Western and Eastern respectively, and the divisions' names were changed from Adams, Patrick, Norris, and Smythe to Northeast, Atlantic, Central, and Pacific respectively.

1995: Nordiques relocate to Colorado 

The team also switched conferences, moving from the Northeast Division in the East to the Pacific Division in the West.

1996: Jets relocate to Phoenix 

The , the Winnipeg Jets moved, becoming the Phoenix Coyotes. The team remained in the Central Division.

1997: Whalers relocate to the Carolinas 

The  saw the Hartford Whalers relocate, becoming the Carolina Hurricanes. The team remained in the Northeast Division.

Twenty-seven teams (1998–99) 
The league also realigned to a strictly geographic six-division structure, with three per conference. The Eastern Conference had the Atlantic, Northeast, and Southeast divisions; while the Western Conference had the Central, Northwest and Pacific divisions. The Toronto Maple Leafs were the only team to switch conferences, moving from the West to the East.

Twenty-eight teams (1999–2000) 
The  saw another team start play, the Atlanta Thrashers, paying the same expansion fee of $80 million ($ million today) as the Predators paid a year earlier. The Thrashers were placed in the Southeast Division.

Thirty teams (2000–2017)
For its , the NHL added the Columbus Blue Jackets and the Minnesota Wild, each paying the same expansion fee of $80 million ($ million today) as Nashville and Atlanta paid in the previous two years. The Blue Jackets were placed in the Central Division, and the Wild in the Northwest, so all six divisions would have five teams each.

For the next 17 seasons, the NHL maintained 30 teams, the second longest period (after the Original Six period) of membership stability in its history.

2006: Anaheim shortens its name

The newly renamed Ducks would win the Stanley Cup that season.

2011: Thrashers relocate to Winnipeg

The team remained in the Southeast Division.

2013 realignment

The 2011 relocation of the former Atlanta Thrashers franchise to the Winnipeg Jets prompted the league to discuss realignment. However, disagreement between the NHL Board of Governors and the National Hockey League Players' Association (NHLPA) caused it to be pushed to 2013.

On December 5, 2011, the NHL Board of Governors originally approved a conference realignment plan to move from a six-division setup to a four-conference structure. However, on January 6, 2012, the National Hockey League Players' Association (NHLPA) rejected that proposed realignment. A new joint NHL-NHLPA plan was proposed in February 2013 as a modification of the previous plan with both the Columbus Blue Jackets and Detroit Red Wings moving to the East and the Winnipeg Jets moving to the West. The league then announced the names of the divisions on July 19: the two eight-team divisions in the Eastern Conference would be the Atlantic Division and the Metropolitan Division, and the two seven-team divisions in the Western Conference would be the Central Division and the Pacific Division.

2014: The Coyotes change their name

Thirty-one teams (2017–2021)
The new team, the Vegas Golden Knights, were put into the Pacific Division.

2020–21: COVID-19 pandemic
The primary consideration acknowledged by the league was that the ongoing restrictions and quarantine requirements affecting the ability of its teams to cross the Canada–United States border on a regular basis would have made the league's traditional alignment and season structure unfeasible for at least 2020–21. As a result, on December 20, 2020, the League announced it had temporarily suspended the Eastern and Western Conferences and re-aligned into four divisions without any conferences: North, East, Central, and West. The North Division consisted of the seven Canadian teams and was the first all-Canadian division since the League first expanded into the United States in 1924. The regular season lasted 56 games and consisted solely of intra-divisional play.

Thirty-two teams (2021–present) 
The league reverted to its pre-COVID-19 divisions in 2021. Under the realignment of those divisions that was announced prior to the pandemic, the new Seattle Kraken were placed in the Pacific Division while the Arizona Coyotes returned to the Central Division.

Expansion and dispersal drafts

Possible expansion 

There have been rumors and talks of potential new sites for existing or new teams in various locations in the United States and Canada, including Quebec City, Hartford, Houston, Saskatoon, Kansas City, and second Southern Ontario team (although the league has actively blocked all of the Southern Ontario efforts to date, citing territorial concerns with the Buffalo Sabres and Toronto Maple Leafs).

See also
 Timeline of the National Football League
 Timeline of Major League Baseball
 Timeline of the National Basketball Association

References

organ